George Schley Stillman (December 13, 1879 – March 15, 1907) was an American football player and coach. He played college football at Yale University where he was selected as a first-team All-American at the tackle position in both 1899 and 1900.  Stillman coached the 1901 Yale football team to a record of 11–1–1. Stillman died at age 27 after contracting typhoid fever.

Early years
Stillman was born in Brookline, Massachusetts, in December 1879. He was the son of Joseph F. Stillman, a sugar refiner, and Eliza M. (Schley) Stillman.  He attended preparatory school at St. Paul's School in Concord, New Hampshire and moved with his family to New York City in 1898.

Yale
Stillman subsequently enrolled at Yale University. While attending Yale, he played for the Yale Bulldogs football team from 1898 to 1900. He played at the tackle position for Yale and was selected as a first-team All-American in 1899 and 1900. He received the first-team All-American honors each year from Walter Camp for Collier's Weekly and from Leslie's Weekly.  Stillman was one of the leaders of the 1900 Yale team that finished its season with a perfect 13–0 record, outscoring opponents by a combined score of 336 to 10.  After Yale ended its season with a 28–0 victory over Harvard, The New York Times wrote that the 1900 Yale team "was without question the strongest team that has been on the field since the Princeton team of 1889."

Stillman was also a member of Yale's track team and rowed for Yale's varsity crew.

After graduating from Yale in 1901, Stillman returned in the fall of 1901 as the head coach of Yale's football team. He led the team to a record of 11–1–1 in his one season as head coach.

During the period from 1899 to 1912, Yale had 14 different head football coaches in 14 years – despite compiling a combined record of 127–11–10 in those years.  For that 14-year span, the Yale football team has been recognized retrospectively (except for the contemporaneous Whitney) as the national championship team by one or more of the major national championship selectors for six seasons – 1900 (Billingsley, Helms, Houlgate, National Championship Foundation, Parke Davis), 1902 (Parke Davis), 1905 (Parke Davis, Whitney), 1906 (Billingsley, Parke Davis, Whitney), 1907 (Billingsley, Helms, Houlgate, National Championship Foundation, Parke Davis, Whitney), and 1909 (Billingsley, Helms, Houlgate, National Championship Foundation, Parke Davis). An erroneous source includes 1901.

Later years
Stillman subsequently entered the banking business, first with the Ladenburg, Thalmann & Co., and then as a founding member of Rosen, Stillman & Co. in New York.  In April 1906, he married Estelle Barbour of Detroit, Michigan, at New York's Fort Street Presbyterian Church.  He contracted typhoid fever in June 1906, which later developed into meningitis. He died in March 1907 at age 27.

Head coaching record

References

1879 births
1907 deaths
All-American college football players
American football tackles
Yale Bulldogs rowers
Yale Bulldogs men's track and field athletes
Sportspeople from Brookline, Massachusetts
Yale Bulldogs football coaches
Yale Bulldogs football players
Players of American football from Massachusetts